Ivan Lendl was the defending champion, but lost in the final this year.

Vitas Gerulaitis won the title, defeating Lendl in the final, 4–6, 6–1, 6–3.

Seeds

  John McEnroe (semifinals)
  Jimmy Connors (semifinals, defaulted)
  Ivan Lendl (final)
  Vitas Gerulaitis (champion)
  Gene Mayer (first round)
  Mats Wilander (third round)
  Mark Edmondson (first round)
  Steve Denton (quarterfinals)
  Tim Mayotte (second round)
  Chip Hooper (second round)
  Shlomo Glickstein (quarterfinals)
  Wojtek Fibak (first round)
  Ramesh Krishnan (third round)
  Tim Gullikson (third round)
  Henri Leconte (quarterfinals)
  Eric Fromm (first round)

Draw

Finals

Top half

Section 1

Section 2

Section 3

Section 4

External links
 Main draw

1982 Grand Prix (tennis)